I'm Ready is the ninth studio album by American R&B singer Natalie Cole. Released on April 21, 1983, it was her only album released on Epic Records.  The album peaked at No. 182 on the Billboard 200 and No. 54 on Billboard R&B Albums chart.

"Too Much Mister" was released as a single in both the US and UK in August 1983 and was premiered on the Greg Edwards Show on Capital Radio (London area only) on Saturday 20 August 1983. The single, which returned Cole to the nightclub playlist, fared well on the UK Blues and Soul Chart and the album had a reasonable run on the UK Blues and Soul Album Chart.

Track listing
All tracks composed by Chuck Jackson and Marvin Yancy; except where indicated.

Side one
"Too Much Mister" – 4:50
"I Won't Deny You" – 3:58
"I'm Ready" (Clarence McDonald, Jackson, Yancy) – 4:10
"Keep It On the Outside" – 4:21

Side two
"Time (Heals All Wounds)" (Chuck Bynum, Joe Blocker, Natalie Cole) – 5:24
"(I'm Coming) Straight from the Heart" – 5:10
"Where's Your Angel" (Allee Willis, Greg Phillinganes) – 3:55
"I'm Your Mirror" (Natalie Cole) – 5:01

CD Bonus Tracks
"Winner (Takes All)" (Eddie Cole, Natalie Cole) – 5:11
"Azz Iz" (Larry Batiste, Claytoven Richardson) – 5:41
"Movin' On" (Eddie Cole, Natalie Cole) – 5:23
"How Can You Stop" (Natalie Cole) – 4:43

Production 
 Larkin Arnold – executive producer
 Chuck Jackson – producer (1-4, 7), mixing (1-8)
 Marvin Yancy – producer (1-4, 7), mixing (1-8)
 Charles Bynum – producer (5)
 Stanley Clarke – producer (5, 6, 8-12)
 Barry Rudolph – recording (1-8), mixing (1-8)
  Erik Zobler – recording (9-12)
 Sabrina Buchanek – assistant engineer (9-12)
 Jeff Clapp – assistant engineer (9-12)
 Jeff Silver – assistant engineer (9-12)
 Tony Lane – design 
 Nancy Donald – design 
 Roger Williams – artwork, design 
 Jerry Rosengren – photography

References

1983 albums
Epic Records albums
albums produced by Stanley Clarke
Natalie Cole albums